"Gloria" is a song performed by American R&B group Enchantment, issued as the second single from the group's eponymous debut album. It was written by lead singer Emanuel Johnson with frequent collaborator Michael Stokes; and was produced by Stokes. The song was the group's biggest hit on the Billboard Hot 100, peaking at #25 in 1977.

Chart performance

Jesse Powell version

In 1996, American contemporary R&B singer Jesse Powell covered "Gloria" and included it on his eponymous debut album. The album features the song in a medley with another Enchantment song, "It's You That I Need", and is titled "The Enchantment Medley: Gloria/It's You That I Need", but only "Gloria" was released as a single. Powell's version was also produced by Michael Stokes; and it peaked at #51 on the Billboard R&B chart.

Music video

The official music video for the song was directed by Lionel C. Martin.

Chart performance

References

External links
 
  
  

1976 songs
1976 singles
1996 singles
Enchantment (band) songs
Jesse Powell songs
Music videos directed by Lionel C. Martin
Silas Records singles
Song recordings produced by Michael Stokes (record producer)
Songs written by Michael Stokes (record producer)
United Artists Records singles